Saïd Aouita (born November 2, 1959) is a former Moroccan track and field athlete. He is the only athlete in history to have won a medal in each of the 800 meters and 5000 meters at the Olympic games. He won the 5000 meters at the 1984 Summer Olympics and the 1987 World Championships in Athletics, as well as the 3000 meters at the 1989 IAAF World Indoor Championships. He is a former world record holder over 1500 metres (3:29.46), 2000 m (4:50.80), 3000 m (7:29.45), and twice at 5000 m (13:00.40 and 12:58.39). He lives in Orlando, Florida.

Early life
Saïd Aouita was born on November 2, 1959 in Kenitra, a coastal Moroccan city. Nine years later, he moved along with his family to Fes due to the nature of his father's work. As a child he spent most of his time playing football and wanted to be a great footballer; however, his outstanding skills in running made his coaches foresee a great future in track and field.

Running career
Aouita had his first start towards stardom at the 1983 World Championships in Athletics held in Helsinki. He contested  the 1500 m and finished third in the final, taking the bronze medal, after the pace slowed in the last 1000 meters and then finished with a sprint.

In 1984, Aouita decided to run the 5000 m at the 1984 Summer Olympics. Antonio Leitão from Portugal ran in first for the majority of the race. Aouita stayed behind Leitão and then sprinted past him on the last lap to win.

1985 was a record-breaking year for Aouita. He ran two world records: first in 5000 m (13:00.40) in Oslo on the 27 July, then in 1500 m (3:29.46) on the 23 August.

In 1986 he missed setting the world record in the 3000 m by 0.44 of a second.
 
In 1987, Aouita's main objective was to excel in the world championship held in Rome and break records.  First, he broke the 2000 m world record with a time of 4:50.81 in Paris and only six days later, he surprised the world by breaking his own world record for 5000 m, becoming the first man to go under 13 minutes, with a time of 12:58.39 minutes. For the 1987 World Championships in Athletics, Aouita decided just to contest the 5000 m. In the 5000 m final, John Ngugi from Kenya set a fair pace, but by no means fast. Aouita, always in control of the race, made his move just before the bell, leading a mass sprint for the finish that he won in 13:26.44.

In 1988, at the 1988 Summer Olympics, he attempted to race in the 800 m and 1500 m but had a hamstring injury which made him finish third in 800 m and withdraw from the 1500 m although he had qualified for the semi-final. In spite of that his bronze medal made him the only athlete in history to combine medals at both 800 m and 5000 m.
 
In 1989, Aouita won the 3000 m at the 1989 IAAF World Indoor Championships in Budapest. Later that year, he broke the world record for the same distance in Köln,  Germany with the time of 7:29.45 and thus, he was the first man in history to go under 7:30:00.

Aouita was a versatile middle and long distance runner, excelling at distances between 800 m and 10,000 m during the eighties. He raced and won against the Olympic champions Joaquim Cruz (800 m), Peter Rono (1500 m), John Ngugi (5000 m) and Alberto Cova (10000 m) over their respective main distances. Between September 1983 and September 1990 he won 115 of his 119 races. The defeats were against world champion Steve Cram over 1500 m, Olympic bronze medalist Alessandro Lambruschini over 3000 m steeplechase, Olympic champions Joaquim Cruz and Paul Ereng over 800 m and world champion Yobes Ondieki over 5000 m.

In the early nineties, Aouita underwent surgery on his leg, after which his doctors advised him to put an end to his career as an athlete for his health. After a set of failures in a number of races he decided to retire from athletics.

Personal life
Said Aouita married Khadija Skhir in 1983, one year before the 1984 Olympic Games. Khadija Skhir is Said Aouita's biggest supporter, and together they have four children: one son, Adil, and three daughters; Soukaina, Sarah, and Zeena. The two eldest daughters, Soukaina and Sarah, were both named by the king of Morocco, Hassan II. Said Aouita's wife, Khadija Skhir is equally interested in sports as she holds a 3rd degree black belt in Taekwondo. Aouita's two eldest daughters are both in the medical field, his son, Adil, is a film director and producer, and his youngest daughter, Zeena, is in the music field of singing and songwriting.

After his athletics career ended, Aouita worked with mixed success as a consultant for numerous sport institutions, as Technical National Manager in Morocco, and National Distance Coach in Australia thanks not only to his fruitful field experience, but also to his academic competences. Now, Aouita is working as Senior Analyst for Al Jazeera Sports channel. Aouita also has a sports clothing company which was established in 2009.

Education 
Aouita has a Bachelor of Science degree in Management and master's degree in Business Administration. He is pursuing a doctorate in Sport Management and Leadership. His subject of concern is a model for elite athletic achievement in Olympics. He is interested in the impact of sport business and coaching young athletes to one day be Olympic champions.

International competitions

World records
1500 metres – 3:29.46 min, Berlin August 23, 1985
2000 metres – 4:50.81 min, Paris July 16, 1987
3000 metres – 7:29.45 min, Koln August 20, 1989
5000 metres – 13:00.40 min, Oslo July 22, 1985
5000 metres – 12:58.35 min, Rome July 27, 1987
Two miles – 8:13.45 min, Turin May 28, 1987

Awards and distinctions

In 2012 Said Aouita had a subway station named after him in London for the 2012 Olympic Games. The Organizers of the Olympic Games of London 2012 announced the launch of a project called "The Underground Olympic Legends Map."
Track & Field News Athlete of the Year 1985 and 1987
44 successive victories in international races from 800 m to 10,000 m in less than 26 months
Three times IAAF Grand Prix Final winner (800 m, 1500 m, and 5000 m)
Honored by International Amateur Athletics Federation for Career Achievement in 2001
The only man in history to run the 800 m under 1:44, the 1500 m under 3:30, the 3000 m under 7:30 and the 5000 m under 13:00.
Best Arab Athlete of the Century by Al Jazeera TV in 2000
Many Merit Medals by King Hassan II
In the 1996 Spring Summer Olympic special Collection Aquachrono, Swatch made a watch which featured Said Aouita on it. 
The fastest train in Morocco is named after Said Aouita 
Aouita was on a postage stamp of The Republic of Azerbaijan in 1996

References

External links

1959 births
Living people
Moroccan male middle-distance runners
Moroccan male long-distance runners
Moroccan male steeplechase runners
Olympic athletes of Morocco
Athletes (track and field) at the 1984 Summer Olympics
Athletes (track and field) at the 1988 Summer Olympics
Athletes (track and field) at the 1992 Summer Olympics
Olympic gold medalists for Morocco
Olympic bronze medalists for Morocco
World record setters in athletics (track and field)
People from Kenitra
World Athletics Championships medalists
Medalists at the 1988 Summer Olympics
Medalists at the 1984 Summer Olympics
Olympic gold medalists in athletics (track and field)
Olympic bronze medalists in athletics (track and field)
Mediterranean Games gold medalists for Morocco
Mediterranean Games silver medalists for Morocco
Athletes (track and field) at the 1983 Mediterranean Games
Athletes (track and field) at the 1987 Mediterranean Games
Universiade medalists in athletics (track and field)
Track & Field News Athlete of the Year winners
Mediterranean Games medalists in athletics
Universiade gold medalists for Morocco
World Athletics Indoor Championships winners
World Athletics Championships winners
Medalists at the 1981 Summer Universiade